Luke Paul McGee (born 2 September 1995) is an English professional goalkeeper who plays for Derby County, on loan from Forest Green Rovers.

Playing career

Tottenham Hotspur
McGee turned professional at Tottenham Hotspur in July 2014, and in October 2015 signed a new contract to keep him at White Hart Lane until 2019. On 31 August 2016, he joined League One club Peterborough United on a four-month loan deal after the club opted to release Ben Alnwick. He made his debut in the English Football League on 10 September, in a 2–2 draw with Port Vale at London Road.

Portsmouth
On 12 July 2017, McGee joined League One club Portsmouth, signing a three-year contract at the club.

Bradford City (loan)
On 16 January 2020, McGee signed for Bradford City for the remainder on the 2019–20 season.

Forest Green Rovers
McGee moved to Forest Green Rovers on 15 July 2020 on a two-year deal.

McGee was awarded the EFL League Two Player of the Month award for January 2022 after conceding just one goal in six matches as his side moved ten points clear at the top of the table.

On 29 January 2023, McGee joined Derby County on loan until the end of the 2022–23 season.

Career statistics

Honours

Forest Green Rovers
League Two: 2021–22

Individual

EFL League Two Player of the Month: January 2022

References

1995 births
Living people
People from Edgware
English footballers
Association football goalkeepers
Tottenham Hotspur F.C. players
Peterborough United F.C. players
Portsmouth F.C. players
Bradford City A.F.C. players
Forest Green Rovers F.C. players
Derby County F.C. players
English Football League players